Statistics of Campeonato da 1ª Divisão do Futebol in the 1973 season.

Overview
Polícia de Segurança Pública won the championship.

References
RSSSF

Macau
Macau
Campeonato da 1ª Divisão do Futebol seasons
1973 in Macau